Saint Salvius of Amiens (or Sauve, Salin, Salinius, Salve, Salvinus, Sauflieu, Saulve, Sauvre; died ) was a 7th-century bishop of Amiens. His feast day is 11 January.

Life and legacy

Salvius was said to come from a wealthy family of Amiens.
He studied divinity from  his youth, and led a very pure life.
After his youth, he founded a monastery dedicated to the Virgin Mary in Montreuil, and became a monk and then abbot. 
Attracted by solitude, he wanted to retire to a cell, but instead was placed at the head of the diocese of Amiens.
Salvius was Bishop of Amiens at the end of the 6th century.
He assiduously traveled through his diocese, proclaiming to all the word of eternal life, and did much to uproot the last vestiges of paganism from the hearts of his flock.
He built the first cathedral in the center of the city.

Salvius's body was transported to Montreuil, in the Diocese of Arras, where he is still venerated.
The town of Saint-Saulve on the northern outskirts of Valenciennes is named after him.
A triptych in the parish church is dedicated to St Saulve, protector of cattle and crops.
According to Catholic tradition, Salvius discovered the remains of the martyr Fermin in Abladène, on the outskirts of Amiens, and had them transferred to the city's cathedral.
Sculptures in the choir of the cathedral of Notre-Dame d'Amiens depict the events: Bishop Salvius at the pulpit asking the faithful to find Firmin's body, discovery of the relics at a place called Abladène on the road to Noyon, transport of the body which heals cripples and restores leaves to the wintry trees as it passes.

Baring-Gould's account

Sabine Baring-Gould (1834–1924) in his Lives Of The Saints wrote under January 11,

Monks of Ramsgate account

The monks of St Augustine's Abbey, Ramsgate wrote in their Book of Saints (1921),

Butler's account

The hagiographer Alban Butler (1710–1773) wrote in his Lives of the Fathers, Martyrs, and Other Principal Saints under January 11,

Notes

Citations

Sources

 

 

7th-century Frankish saints
610s deaths

Year of birth unknown

Year of death uncertain